Muhammad: The Last Prophet is a 2002 American animated religious epic film, produced by Badr International and directed by Richard Rich. The movie was released in limited cinemas in the United States and the United Kingdom. The film focuses on the early days of Islam and Muhammad.

In accordance with Islamic law and tradition, Muhammad and the first four caliphs (Abu Bakr, Umar, Uthman, and Ali) are not depicted in the film or any of its prequels. Scenes that include Muhammad are shown from his perspective, with his words paraphrased by the narrator. The film has been approved by the Council of Al-Azhar Al-Shareef (Islamic Research Academy in Egypt) and the Supreme Islamic Shiite Council of Lebanon.  
 
All of the characters, such as the main character Malek and the rest of his family, are fictional.

The film has been dubbed into several languages including Arabic, French, Turkish and Malay.  The dialogue of the Arabic version differs from the English version of the film, and the dialogue of the Arabic version is more consistent and similar with traditional Islamic historical narratives.

Plot
The film follows Muhammad's first years as a prophet starting with Islam's beginnings in Mecca in which the Muslims are persecuted, the exodus to Medina, and ending with the Muslims' triumphant return to Mecca. A number of crucial events, such as the Battle of Badr, the Battle of Uhud, the Battle of the Trench, and the Conquest of Mecca are depicted.

Consultant
 Khaled Abou El Fadl
 Sheikh Ayman Jabalagi
 John Esposito

Cast
List of cast members and characters of this film, as well as the prequels:

Fictional characters
 Brian Nissen as Malek (Arabic version: Bassam Kousa as old and Mansour Salti as young)
 Catherine Lavin as Arwa (Arabic version: Laura Abou Assaad)
 Tiffany Johnson as Siham (Arabic version: Bahla Hegazy)
 Mark Hunt as Jahm (Arabic version: Muhammad Mustafi)
 Catherine Lavin as Jalilah (Arabic version: Thara Debsi)
 Lauren Shaffel as Huda (Arabic version: Youmna Halabi)
 Anthony Micheal Jr. as Hadi (Arabic version: Muhammad Al-Arabi Tarqan)
 D. Hunter White as Amahl

Historical figures

Arabic version additional voices
 Anjy Al-Yousif
 Fadwa Souleimane
 Mofeed Abu Hamda

Prequels
Three short prequels were released in 2012, all directed by Rich:
Before the Light (relating to events in Arabia before the birth of Muhammad, with his grandfather, Abdul-Muttalib, as the main character) on 24 July 2012
Salman the Persian (the story of Salman's quest for religious enlightenment) on 24 July 2012
Great Women of Islam (pertaining to the roles of women in Arabia before and after the birth of Islam) on 24 July 2012

Reception
On Metacritic the film has a score of 47% based on reviews from 4 critics.

Dana Stevens of The New York Times gave it 3 out of 5 and wrote: "Faithful to Islamic law's prohibition against representing its title character, this movie gives a prophet's-eye-view on the story." Maitland McDonagh of TV Guide gave it 2 out of 5 and described it as: "firmly within the long tradition of bland, upbeat and earnest religious instructional films."

See also
 List of Islamic films
 List of animated Islamic films
 List of films about Muhammad

References

External links
 
 
 
 Fine Media Group
 Images from the film
 archive.ph

2002 films
2002 animated films
2000s American animated films
2000s children's drama films
American children's animated drama films
2000s adventure films
2002 drama films
2000s English-language films
Religious epic films
Films about Muhammad
Religious animation
Islamic animated films
Films directed by Richard Rich
Films with screenplays by Brian Nissen
Animated adventure films
Animated drama films
Films set in the Arabian Peninsula
Saudi Arabia in fiction
Films about race and ethnicity